The Grasshopper-class torpedo gunboat was a class of torpedo gunboat built for the Royal Navy in the late 19th century.  All three ships were scrapped before World War I.

Design
The Grasshopper class was designed by Nathaniel Barnaby in 1886 and were essentially repeats of the Rattlesnake of 1886. They were engined with two sets of Maudslay, Sons & Field triple-expansion steam engines, two locomotive boilers, and twin screws.

Armament
The class was each fitted with one 4 inch Gun and six 3-pounder guns.  Two  torpedo tubes and two additional 14-inch torpedo carriages. 4 reload torpedoes were carried

Ships

See also
List of torpedo gunboats of the Royal Navy

References

Bibliography

 
Ship classes of the Royal Navy
Torpedo gunboat classes
 S